Arnold Wienholt, senior, (22 January 1826 – 16 January 1895) was a politician in Queensland, Australia. He was a Member of the Queensland Legislative Assembly, representing Warwick from 10 June 1863 to 25 June 1867. Wienholt was born in Laugharne, Wales and arrived in Australia . His brother Edward Wienholt was also a Member of the Queensland Legislative Assembly and a landowner.

References

Members of the Queensland Legislative Assembly
1826 births
1895 deaths
People from Laugharne
19th-century Australian politicians
Welsh emigrants to Australia